Aleksandr Igorevich Gapechkin (born 16 June 2002) is a Russian football player. He plays for FC Rodina-2 Moscow on loan from FC Volga Ulyanovsk.

Club career
He made his debut in the Russian Premier League for FC Rostov on 18 October 2020 in a game against FC Akhmat Grozny.

References

External links
 
 

2002 births
Living people
Russian footballers
Association football defenders
FC Rostov players
Valmieras FK players
FC Volga Ulyanovsk players
Russian Premier League players
Russian First League players
Latvian Higher League players
Russian expatriate footballers
Expatriate footballers in Latvia
Russian expatriate sportspeople in Latvia